The Running Fight is a 1915 silent film drama, directed by James Durkin and distributed by Paramount Pictures. The film is based on a novel by William Hamilton Osborne, and stars Violet Heming.

Preservation status
The film is preserved today at the Library of Congress.

Cast
Robert Cummings - Peter V. Wilkinson
Violet Heming - Leslie Wilkinson
Thurlow Bergen - Eliot Beekman
Robert Cain - District Attorney Leech
William T. Carleton - Colonel Moorehead
Clarissa Selwynne - Madeline Braine
George Pauncefort - Giles Illingsworth
Alfred Kappeler - Roy Pallister
Philip Robson - Bannister Skeen

References

External links
The Running Fight at IMDB
The Running Fight at AllMovie

1915 films
American silent feature films
Films based on American novels
Paramount Pictures films
1915 drama films
Silent American drama films
American black-and-white films
1910s American films